Kohlstedt is a surname. Notable people with the surname include: 

Martin Kohlstedt (born 1988), German composer, pianist, and record producer
Sally Gregory Kohlstedt (born 1943), American historian of science

See also
Kihlstedt